Birgit Lohberg-Schulz (also Schulz-Lohberg, Lohberg or Schulz; born 3 December 1965) is a retired German freestyle swimmer who won two bronze relay medals at the 1987 and 1989 European Aquatics Championships. She also competed at the 1988 Summer Olympics in the 200 m freestyle and 200 m and 400 m medley events but did not reach the finals.

References

1965 births
Living people
German female swimmers
Swimmers at the 1988 Summer Olympics
Olympic swimmers of West Germany
European Aquatics Championships medalists in swimming
People from Moers
Sportspeople from Düsseldorf (region)
20th-century German women
21st-century German women